Jean Camille Cipra (1893–1952) was a French landscape painter.

He was born in Pilzen, Austria-Hungary. He died in Paris in 1952. He emigrated to France and lived in Bourges. Cipra exhibited his works for many years at the Salon des Indépendants and at the Salon d'Automne. He is famous for his landscapes of the Loire Valley, Burgundy, Normandy and Brittany.

His Paysage de Loire is in the Musée de la Loire, Cosne-sur-Loire.

Exhibitions
 Jean-Camille Cipra exhibition, the City Museum of La Charité-sur-Loire, June 7 to September 30, 2006.

Notes

Sources
 Musée de la Loire in Cosne-sur-Loire

1893 births
1952 deaths
20th-century French painters
20th-century French male artists
French male painters
Modern painters
Artists from Plzeň
19th-century French male artists
Czechoslovak emigrants to France